Dead Souls (Mjórtvyje dúshi) is a novel by Nikolai Gogol, first published in 1842, and widely regarded as an exemplar of 19th-century Russian literature. The novel chronicles the travels and adventures of Pavel Ivanovich Chichikov (Russian: Павел Иванович Чичиков) and the people whom he encounters. These people typify the Russian middle aristocracy of the time. Gogol himself saw his work as an "epic poem in prose", and within the book characterised it as a "novel in verse". Gogol intended the novel to be the first part of a three-volume work, but burned the manuscript of the second part shortly before his death. Although the novel ends in mid-sentence (like Sterne's Sentimental Journey), it is regarded by some as complete in the extant form.

Title
The original title, as shown on the illustration (cover page), was "The Wanderings of Chichikov, or Dead Souls. Poema", which contracted to merely "Dead Souls". In the Russian Empire, before the emancipation of the serfs in 1861, landowners had the right to own serfs to farm their land. Serfs were for most purposes considered the property of the landowner, who could buy, sell or mortgage them, as any other chattel. To count serfs (and people in general), the classifier "soul" was used: e.g., "six souls of serfs". The plot of the novel relies on "dead souls" (i.e., "dead serfs") which are still accounted for in property registers. On another level, the title refers to the "dead souls" of Gogol's characters, all of which represent different aspects of poshlost (a Russian noun rendered as "commonplace, vulgarity", moral and spiritual, with overtones of middle-class pretentiousness, fake significance and philistinism).

It is also described as a picaresque novel, a literary genre virtually non-existent in Russian literature of the times.

Background
Early 20th Century critics began to suggest the story contained elements that may have been inspired by Inferno of the Divine Comedy, but that idea has since diminished among scholars. "Gogol reveals to his readers an encompassing picture of the ailing social system in Russia after the unsuccessful French invasion. As in many of Gogol's short stories, the social criticism of Dead Souls is communicated primarily through absurd and hilarious satire." Unlike the short stories, however, Dead Souls was meant to offer solutions rather than simply point out problems. This grander scheme was largely unrealized at Gogol's death; the work was never completed, and it is primarily the earlier, darker part of the novel that is remembered.

In their studies of Gogol, Andrey Bely, D. S. Mirsky, Vladimir Nabokov, and other modernist critics rejected the commonly held view of Dead Souls as a reformist or satirical work. For instance, Nabokov regarded the plot of Dead Souls as unimportant and Gogol as a great writer whose works skirted the irrational and whose prose style combined superb descriptive power with a disregard for novelistic clichés. True, Chichikov displays a most extraordinary moral rot, but the whole idea of buying and selling dead souls is, to Nabokov, ridiculous on its face; therefore, the provincial setting of the novel is a most unsuitable backdrop for any of the progressive, reformist or Christian readings of the work.

Structure

The novel has a circular structure, following Chichikov as he visits the estates of landowners living around the capital of a guberniya. Although Gogol aspired to emulate the Odyssey and the Divine Comedy, many critics derive the structure of Dead Souls from the picaresque novels of the 16th and 17th centuries in that it is divided into a series of somewhat disjointed episodes, and the plot concerns a gentrified version of the rascal protagonist of the original picaresques.

Konstantin Aksakov was the first to bring out a detailed juxtaposition of Gogol's and Homer's works: "Gogol's epic revives the ancient Homeric epic; you recognize its character of importance, its artistic merits and the widest scope. When comparing one thing to another, Gogol completely loses himself in the subject, leaving for a time the occasion that gave rise to his comparison; he will talk about it, until the subject is exhausted. Every reader of The Iliad was struck by this device, too." Nabokov also pointed out the Homeric roots of the complicated absurdist technique of Gogol's comparisons and digressions.

Characters
Of all Gogol's creations, Chichikov stands out as the incarnation of the complacent poshlost. Other characters—the squires Chichikov visits on his shady business—include: Sobakevich, a strong, silent, economical man; Manilov, a sentimentalist with pursed lips; M-me Korobochka, a widow; Nozdryov, a bully. Plyushkin, the miser, appears to transcend the poshlost archetype in that he is not complacent but miserable.

Plot

Book One
The story follows the exploits of Chichikov, a middle-aged gentleman of middling social class and means. Chichikov arrives in a small town and turns on the charm to woo key local officials and landowners. He reveals little about his past, or his purpose, as he sets about carrying out his bizarre and mysterious plan to acquire "dead souls."

The government would tax the landowners based on how many serfs (or "souls") the landowner owned, determined by the census. Censuses in this period were infrequent, so landowners would often be paying taxes on serfs that were no longer living, thus the "dead souls." It is these dead souls, existing on paper only, that Chichikov seeks to purchase from the landlords in the villages he visits; he merely tells the prospective sellers that he has a use for them, and that the sellers would be better off anyway, since selling them would relieve the present owners of a needless tax burden.

Although the townspeople Chichikov comes across are gross caricatures, they are not flat stereotypes by any means. Instead, each is neurotically individual, combining the official failings that Gogol typically satirizes (greed, corruption, paranoia) with a curious set of personal quirks.

Setting off for the surrounding estates, Chichikov at first assumes that the ignorant provincials will be more than eager to give their dead souls up in exchange for a token payment. The task of collecting the rights to dead people proves difficult, however, due to the persistent greed, suspicion, and general distrust of the landowners. He still manages to acquire some 400 souls, swears the sellers to secrecy, and returns to the town to have the transactions recorded legally.

Back in the town, Chichikov continues to be treated like a prince amongst the petty officials, and a celebration is thrown in honour of his purchases. Very suddenly, however, rumours flare up that the serfs he bought are all dead, and that he was planning to elope with the Governor's daughter. In the confusion that ensues, the backwardness of the irrational, gossip-hungry townspeople is most delicately conveyed. Absurd suggestions come to light, such as the possibility that Chichikov is Napoleon in disguise or the notorious vigilante 'Captain Kopeikin'. The now disgraced traveller is immediately ostracized from the company he had been enjoying and has no choice but to flee the town.

Chichikov is revealed by the author to be a former mid-level government official fired for corruption and narrowly avoiding jail. His macabre mission to acquire "dead souls" is actually just another one of his "get rich quick" schemes. Once he acquires enough dead souls, he will take out an enormous loan against them and pocket the money.

Book Two
In the novel's second part, Chichikov flees to another part of Russia and attempts to continue his venture. He tries to help the idle landowner Tentetnikov gain favor with General Betrishchev so that Tentetnikov may marry the general's daughter, Ulinka. To do this, Chichikov agrees to visit many of Betrishchev's relatives, beginning with Colonel Koshkaryov. From there Chichikov begins again to go from estate to estate, encountering eccentric and absurd characters all along the way. Eventually he purchases an estate from the destitute Khlobuyev, and somewhere in the missing chapters is arrested when he attempts to forge the will of Khlobuyev's rich aunt. He is pardoned thanks to the intervention of the kindly Mourazov but is forced to flee the village. The novel ends mid-sentence with the prince who arranged Chichikov's arrest giving a grand speech that rails against corruption in the Russian government.

Adaptations
Mikhail Bulgakov adapted the novel for the stage for a production at the Moscow Art Theatre. The seminal theatre practitioner Constantin Stanislavski directed the play, which opened on 28 November 1932.

The extant sections of Dead Souls formed the basis for an opera in 1976 by Russian composer Rodion Shchedrin. In it Shchedrin captures the different townspeople with whom Chichikov deals in isolated musical episodes, each of which employs a different musical style to evoke the character's particular personality.

The novel was adapted for screen in 1984 by Mikhail Schweitzer as a television miniseries of the same name.

In 2006 the novel was dramatised for radio in two parts by the BBC and broadcast on Radio 4. It was played more for comic than satirical effect, the main comedy deriving from the performance of Mark Heap as Chichikov and from the original placing of the narrator. Michael Palin narrates the story, but is revealed actually to be following Chichikov, riding in his coach for example, or sleeping in the same bed, constantly irritating Chichikov with his running exposition.

The first UK theatre production was staged by Theatre Collection in London during November 2014, directed by Victor Sobchak and starring Garry Voss as Chichikov and Vera Horton as Korobochka.

English translations
 1886: Isabel Hapgood
 1916: C. J. Hogarth (sometimes printed as "D. J. Hogarth". Now in the public domain; introduction by John Cournos)
 1922: Constance Garnett (published by Chatto & Windus, reissued in 2007 by Kessinger Publishing; introduction by Clifford Odets)
 1942: Bernard Guilbert Guerney (published by the New York Readers' Club, revised 1948, and again by Susanne Fusso in 1996). Considered to be the best English version by Vladimir Nabokov, with the qualification that no later translations had yet been released at the time of his study in 1944.
 1957: George Reavey (published by Oxford World's Classics, revised by George Gibian and reprinted in 1985 by W. W. Norton & Company as a critical edition with supplementary essays and criticism).
 1961: David Magarshack (published by Penguin Classics).
 1961: Andrew R. MacAndrew (published by The New American Library; foreword by Frank O'Connor). 
 1996: Richard Pevear and Larissa Volokhonsky (published by Pantheon Books).
 1998: Christopher English (published by Oxford World's Classics, reissued in 2009).
 2004: Robert A. Maguire (published by Penguin Classics).
 2008: Donald Rayfield (published by Garnett Press; reissued in 2012 by New York Review Books).

References

Sources

 Benedetti, Jean. 1999. Stanislavski: His Life and Art. Revised edition. Original edition published in 1988. London: Methuen. .
 English, Christopher, trans. and ed. 1998. Dead Souls: A Poem. By Nikolai Gogol. Oxford World's Classics ser. Oxford: Oxford UP. .
 Fusso, Susanne. 1993. Designing Dead Souls: Anatomy of Disorder in Gogol. Anniversary edition. Stanford: Stanford UP. .
 Kolchin, Peter. 1990. Unfree Labor: American Slavery and Russian Serfdom. Cambridge, MA:  Harvard UP.

External links

 
  – D.J. Hogarth's English translation.
 
  Full text of Dead Souls in the original Russian

1842 Russian novels
Novels by Nikolai Gogol
Picaresque novels
Novels set in the Russian Empire
Russian novels adapted into plays
Bureaucracy in fiction
Russian satirical novels